Elmer Township is the name of some places in the U.S. state of Michigan:

 Elmer Township, Oscoda County, Michigan
 Elmer Township, Sanilac County, Michigan

Michigan township disambiguation pages